This is a list of fictional dogs in live-action television and is a subsidiary to the list of fictional dogs. It is a collection of various non-animated dogs in television.

Television (live-action)

References

Lists of fictional canines
Fictional dogs